The Lodi News-Sentinel is a daily newspaper based in Lodi, California, United States, and serving northern San Joaquin and southern Sacramento counties.

History 
The Lodi News-Sentinel was founded in 1881 by Ralph Ellis, a former sheriff, farmer and flourmill operator.  Ownership has changed over the years from Ralph Ellis to Samuel B. Axtell to Fordyce P. Roper and George H. Moore, to Clyde C. Church, and to Fred E. Weybret. On June 1, 2015, the paper was sold to Central Valley News-Sentinel Inc., led by veteran newspaper publisher Steven Malkowich. The new owners have newspaper assets in the United States and Canada, including several in California.

The newspaper has occupied many sites, moving eight times since its debut in 1881. The current site at 125 N. Church Street was formerly occupied by the Bethel Open Bible Church when Fred Weybret moved the newspaper in 1968. A $1.3 million remodel and expansion was completed in 1992.

The newspaper is printed five days per week and delivered to nearly 15,000 homes throughout Lodi, Galt, Woodbridge, Lockeford, Clements, Acampo and Thornton. An additional 8,000 readers follow the newspaper's publication online via the newspaper's website. Today, the newspaper employs approximately 85 employees.

Discover Lodi, an annual publication of the Lodi News-Sentinel, is a guide and website for visitors to Lodi that highlights the region's wine production.

References

Daily newspapers published in California
Lodi, California
Mass media in San Joaquin County, California
Publications established in 1881
1881 establishments in California